The 1999–2000 FIBA EuroLeague was the 43rd installment of the European top-tier level professional club competition for basketball clubs (now called simply EuroLeague). It began on September 23, 1999, and ended on April 20, 2000. The competition's Final Four was held at PAOK Sports Arena, Thessaloniki, with Panathinaikos defeating Maccabi Elite Tel Aviv in the EuroLeague Final, in front of 8,500 spectators.

Efes Pilsen finished in the third position, and FC Barcelona finished fourth.

Competition system
24 teams (the national domestic league champions from the best leagues, and a variable number of other clubs from the most important national domestic leagues). The competition culminated in a Final Four.

Team allocation

Country ranking
For the 1999–2000 EuroLeague, the countries are allocated places according to their place on the FIBA country rankings, which takes into account their performance in European competitions from 1996–97 to 1998–99.

Note

Teams 
The labels in the parentheses show how each team qualified for the place of its starting round:

 1st, 2nd, 3rd, etc.: League position after Playoffs
 WC: Wild card

First round

Second round
(The individual scores and standings of the First stage were accumulated in the Second stage)

If one or more clubs were level on won-lost record, tiebreakers were applied in the following order:
Head-to-head record in matches between the tied clubs
Overall point difference in games between the tied clubs
Overall point difference in all group matches (first tiebreaker if tied clubs were not in the same group)
Points scored in all group matches
Sum of quotients of points scored and points allowed in each group match

Top 16

|}

Quarterfinals

|}

Final Four

Semifinals 
April 18, PAOK Sports Arena, Thessaloniki

|}

Third place game
April 20, PAOK Sports Arena, Thessaloniki

|}

Final
April 20, PAOK Sports Arena, Thessaloniki

|}

Awards

FIBA EuroLeague Top Scorer
 Miljan Goljović ( Zlatorog Laško)

FIBA EuroLeague Final Four MVP
 Željko Rebrača ( Panathinaikos)

FIBA EuroLeague Finals Top Scorer
 Nate Huffman ( Maccabi Tel Aviv)

FIBA EuroLeague All-Final Four Team

References

External links
1999–2000 FIBA EuroLeague
1999–2000 FIBA EuroLeague
Eurobasket.com 1999–2000 FIBA EuroLeague

 
 
1999-2000